James Bullough Lansing (born James Martini, January 2, 1902 – September 29, 1949) was a pioneering American audio engineer and loudspeaker designer who was most notable for establishing two audio companies that bear his name, Altec Lansing and JBL, the latter taken from his initials, JBL.

Biography

Early years 
James Martini was born on January 2, 1902, in Greenridge, Nilwood Township, Macoupin County, Illinois to parents Henry Martini of St. Louis, Missouri, and Grace Erbs Martini of Central City, Illinois. His father was a coal mining engineer which meant the family moved around considerably in James' early years. He was the ninth of fourteen children. He lived for a short time with the Bullough family in Springfield, Illinois, and later took their name.

Lansing graduated eighth grade at Lawrence School in Springfield, Illinois, attended Springfield High School and also took courses at a small business college in Springfield.

At a young age he built a Leyden jar to play pranks on his friends. He also built crystal sets and a radio transmitter which was apparently powerful enough for the signal to reach Great Lakes Naval Station in Illinois. Lansing's transmitter was then dismantled when the Navy tracked the source down.

Lansing had worked as an automotive mechanic and attended an automotive school in Detroit courtesy of the dealer he worked for.

His mother died on November 1, 1924, when he was 22, he then left home and met his future wife, Glenna Peterson, in Salt Lake City in 1925. At the time he was working for a radio station as an engineer. He also worked for the Baldwin Radio Company and met his future business partner, Ken Decker in the city.

Career 
Lansing and Decker moved to Los Angeles where they set up a business manufacturing loudspeakers. It was called the Lansing Manufacturing Company. Just before the company was registered on March 9, 1927, Lansing changed his name from James Martini to James Bullough Lansing at the suggestion of his future wife, Glenna. Most of his brothers had adopted the surname Martin, two of which (Bill and George) came to LA to work with him.

Decker was killed in an airplane crash in 1939 and Lansing Manufacturing Company began to suffer financial difficulties without his business guidance. Altec Service Corporation bought Lansing Manufacturing Company in 1941, seeing the company as a valuable source for loudspeaker components. The combined company was named Altec Lansing. James B. Lansing was made VP of Engineering with a five-year contract.

In 1946, Lansing left the company on the day his contract expired and started a new company called "Lansing Sound, Incorporated". Altec Lansing had a problem with that name's similarity to trademarked brands they had developed, so James Bullough Lansing renamed his new company "James B. Lansing Sound, Incorporated". Eventually, this became shortened to JBL on product branding and then officially as the company name.

James Lansing was noted as an innovative engineer, but a poor businessman. As a result of deteriorating business conditions and personal problems, he killed himself by hanging himself in his home in San Marcos on September 29, 1949, aged 47.

References 

 History of JBL
 Lansing Heritage

External links 
 Website dedicated to James Bullough Lansing
 JBL company history

1902 births
1949 suicides
JBL
American acoustical engineers
20th-century American engineers
Suicides by hanging in California
1949 deaths